The 1974 Cleveland Browns season was the team's 29th season, and 25th season with the National Football League.

The 1974 Browns were only the second Browns team to post a losing record in the 29-year history of the franchise.

Season summary 
The Browns finished 4–10 that year and did not look good doing it. All those great players who had led the Browns to much success through the 1960s and the early part of the '70s, either had retired or were ready to do so. And, as mentioned, since the Browns had been picking at the tail end of the draft for so long, they had little in the way of reinforcements to step into those stars' shoes.

With the exception of the Denver Broncos, who had a modest 7–6–1 record, none of the teams the Browns defeated in 1974 finished above .500. The Browns topped the Broncos 23–21 by scoring two unanswered touchdowns at the end of the game behind a backup third year quarterback by the name of Brian Sipe, out of San Diego State, who the Browns drafted in the thirteenth round of the 1972 draft, and had been on the team's taxi squad during his first two seasons with the team. They beat the 7–7 Houston Oilers 20–7, the 7–7 New England Patriots 21–14 and the 6–8 San Francisco 49ers 7–0 in a tundra-like setting after one of the worst snowstorms in Northeast Ohio history.

Otherwise, it wasn't good. The Browns offense couldn't score enough points behind the direction of quarterback Mike Phipps, taken with the No. 3 overall pick in the 1970 NFL Draft that was acquired when the club dealt HOF wide receiver Paul Warfield to the Miami Dolphins. And the defense had trouble stopping people. The Browns got off to a 1–5 start, getting humbled 33–7 by the Cincinnati Bengals in—by far—the most lopsided opening-day loss in franchise history to that point—and losing by 22 points (29–7) to the St. Louis Cardinals and by 16 (40–24) to the Oakland Raiders. They also were thumped by 24 (41–17) by the Dallas Cowboys in the next-to-last game of the season.

But pride is a hard thing to totally extinguish. The Browns players left from those great teams still had it, and despite the lack of overall talent on the club, it helped them to stay close in some other games.

They gave the eventual Super Bowl champion Steelers all they could handle in both meetings, losing 20–16 and 26–16, lost by 10 points (34–24) in the rematch with the Bengals, fell by five (15–10) to the 9–5 Buffalo Bills, lost 36–35 to the San Diego Chargers when Sipe fumbled the snap as the club was positioning the ball in the middle of the field for Don Cockroft to kick a game-winning field goal on the final play, and were beaten by four (28–24) in the rematch with the Oilers in the season finale.

On the season as a whole, the Browns started games well and ended them well, being outscored just 62–61 in the first quarter and outscoring their foes 73–63 in the fourth. But in the middle two quarters combined, they were out-done by a whopping 219–117 count, and therein lies most of the reason why they gave up 344 points, the most in team history at the time.

Offseason

NFL Draft 
The following were selected in the 1974 NFL Draft.

Exhibition schedule

Regular season

Schedule 

Note: Intra-division opponents are in bold text.

Standings

Personnel

Staff / Coaches

Roster

References

External links 
 1974 Cleveland Browns at Pro Football Reference
 1974 Cleveland Browns Statistics at jt-sw.com
 1974 Cleveland Browns Schedule at jt-sw.com
 1974 Cleveland Browns at DatabaseFootball.com  
 Season summary and team stats at Cleveland Browns.com

Cleveland
Cleveland Browns seasons
Cleveland Browns